is a 1986 video game developed by ISCO and published by Takara in Japan for the Famicom. It is based on the popular toyline Transformers. The game was made available on the Wii's Virtual Console service on June 10, 2008.

The game stars Autobot protagonist Ultra Magnus. The titular Mystery is the identity of Optimus Prime's (referred to in the title as "Convoy") killer, as the 1986 film did not see a Japanese release for another four years. Thus, Optimus Prime's death was not adequately explained to the Japanese audience; this game was intended to capitalize on that gap.

Gameplay
The player controls Ultra Magnus, who must shoot his way through 10 horizontally and vertically scrolling levels consisting of various Decepticon enemies, with a boss fight at the end of each level. He can transform into a car carrier, which makes it easier for him to avoid enemy attacks, drive through narrow entrances and shoot enemies that are flying above him. Along the way, he can also pick up various power-ups which can give him wider ranging firepower or even the ability to fly. There are two Warp Zones within the game; they can be found by rescuing Bumblebee from the Decepticons.

The bosses for each level consist of mostly large Decepticon symbols in different color palettes. The only Deceptions Ultra Magnus actually fights are Megatron, who for unexplained reasons is the penultimate boss, and Trypticon (known in Japan as Dinosaurer), the final boss.

Another playable character in the game is Rodimus Prime, who can be unlocked by collecting the letters that spell Rodimus. One is hidden, sequentially, in levels 1, 2, 4, 5, 7, 8, and 9. However, though his vehicle mode has its own graphics, his robot-mode sprite is Ultra Magnus in Rodimus's palette.

Other media

Anime
In collaboration with the 30th anniversary of Transfomers, as well as the 35th anniversary of Choro-Q, a flash anime adaptation of the game, produced by DLE, titled , began airing in Japan on January 6, 2015.
 The opening theme is "physical" by Oldcodex. A second season titled  premiered in Japan on July 6, 2015.

Voice actors and characters
Main characters
Yoshimasa Hosoya as Optimus Prime / GTR Optimus Prime / Convoy 
Ryohei Kimura as Bumblebee / Bumble
Tatsuhisa Suzuki as Lockdown
Supporting characters
Yuichi Nakamura as Sunstreaker and Sideswipe, Rumble
Go Inoue as Prowl 
Kenshō Ono as Hot Rod (Rodimus Convoy)
Jun Fukushima as Wheeljack
Kōji Yusa as Jazz (Meister)
Kousuke Toriumi as Red Alert
Kōki Uchiyama as Smokescreen 
Fukujuro Katayama as Bluestreak
Sōichirō Hoshi as Tracks and Sanada Yukimura (from Sengoku BASARA 4)
Akira Ishida as Ultra Magnus
Keiji Fujiwara as Megatron
Tomokazu Sugita as Starscream
Kaito Ishikawa as Shockwave
Nobuhiko Okamoto as Soundwave
Tomoaki Maeno as Drift
Tesshō Genda as Kazumi Araiwa (from Cooking Papa)
Sumire Uesaka as Arcee
Shouta Aoi as Cliff
Kentarō Itō as Skywarp
Kenjiro Tsuda as Thundercracker

Smartphone app
The studio DLE also produced a smartphone app, titled , which was released for iOS and Android devices in August 2014. This was a remake of the original game using Q Transformers Optimus Prime and Bumblebee as playable characters instead of Ultra Magnus and Rodimus Prime. Like the original, it is quite difficult but serves as an endless runner game instead of the platformer style of the original. This was a Japanese app store exclusive, but the servers have been shut down since its release.

Reception
Transformers: Mystery of Convoy is known for its high difficulty level and poor stage design, resulting in a largely negative reception both at release and retrospectively. 1UP.com called it the "perfect example of a shameless tie-in." They criticized the game for its high level of difficulty, the game's implementation of the transforming ability and how the ninth stage loops infinitely unless a specific pattern is followed.

Notes

References

External links
 Official anime website 

Mystery Of Convoy
1986 video games
Nintendo Entertainment System games
Japan-exclusive video games
Run and gun games
Takara video games
Video games developed in Japan
Video games set in the United States
Virtual Console games
2015 anime television series debuts
Mystery Of Convoy
Tokyo MX original programming
Video games adapted into television shows